The 40th parallel north is a circle of latitude that is 40 degrees north of the Earth's equatorial plane. It crosses Europe, the Mediterranean Sea, Asia, the Pacific Ocean, North America, and the Atlantic Ocean.

At this latitude the sun is visible for 15 hours, 1 minute and 28 seconds during the summer solstice and 9 hours, 20 minutes during the winter solstice. On 21 June, the maximum altitude of the sun is 73.44 degrees, while it's 26.56 degrees on 21 December.

The maximum altitude of the Sun is > 35.00º in October and > 28.00º in November.

The 40th parallel north is the southern baseline for Canada's National Topographic System.

Around the world
Starting in Spain at the Prime Meridian and heading eastwards, the parallel 40° north passes through:

{| class="wikitable plainrowheaders"
! scope="col" width="125" | Co-ordinates
! scope="col" | Country, territory or sea
! scope="col" | Notes
|-
| 
! scope="row" | 
| Valencian Community
|-
| style="background:#b0e0e6;" | 
! scope="row" style="background:#b0e0e6;" | Mediterranean Sea
| style="background:#b0e0e6;" | Passing just north of the island of Majorca, 
|-
| 
! scope="row" | 
| Island of Menorca
|-
| style="background:#b0e0e6;" | 
! scope="row" style="background:#b0e0e6;" | Mediterranean Sea
| style="background:#b0e0e6;" |
|-
| 
! scope="row" | 
| Island of Sardinia
|-
| style="background:#b0e0e6;" | 
! scope="row" style="background:#b0e0e6;" | Mediterranean Sea
| style="background:#b0e0e6;" | Tyrrhenian Sea
|-
| 
! scope="row" | 
|Campania
|-
| style="background:#b0e0e6;" | 
! scope="row" style="background:#b0e0e6;" | Mediterranean Sea
| style="background:#b0e0e6;" | Gulf of Policastro
|-
| 
! scope="row" | 
|Basilicata, Calabria
|-
| style="background:#b0e0e6;" | 
! scope="row" style="background:#b0e0e6;" | Mediterranean Sea
| style="background:#b0e0e6;" | Gulf of Taranto
|-
| 
! scope="row" | 
| Apulia
|-
| style="background:#b0e0e6;" | 
! scope="row" style="background:#b0e0e6;" | Mediterranean Sea
| style="background:#b0e0e6;" | Strait of Otranto
|-
| 
! scope="row" | 
|Passing just north of Sarandë and just south of Gjirokastër
|-
| 
! scope="row" | 
|
|-
| style="background:#b0e0e6;" | 
! scope="row" style="background:#b0e0e6;" | Mediterranean Sea
| style="background:#b0e0e6;" | Aegean Sea
|-
| 
! scope="row" | 
| Kassandra and Sithonia
|-
| style="background:#b0e0e6;" | 
! scope="row" style="background:#b0e0e6;" | Mediterranean Sea
| style="background:#b0e0e6;" | Aegean Sea
|-
| 
! scope="row" | 
| Island of Lemnos
|-
| style="background:#b0e0e6;" | 
! scope="row" style="background:#b0e0e6;" | Mediterranean Sea
| style="background:#b0e0e6;" | Aegean Sea
|-
| 
! scope="row" | 
| Passing just north of Ankara
|-
| 
! scope="row" | 
| Passing through Verin Artashat and Norashen, Ararat
|-
| 
! scope="row" | 
| Passing through Karabakh and Kur-Araz Lowland
|-
| style="background:#b0e0e6;" | 
! scope="row" style="background:#b0e0e6;" | Caspian Sea
| style="background:#b0e0e6;" |
|-
| 
! scope="row" | 
|
|-
| 
! scope="row" | 
|
|-
| 
! scope="row" | 
|
|-
| 
! scope="row" | 
|
|-
| 
! scope="row" | 
| For about 
|-
| 
! scope="row" | 
|
|-
| 
! scope="row" | 
| Sokh exclave - for about 
|-
| 
! scope="row" | 
|
|-
| 
! scope="row" | 
| Shohimardon exclave - for about 
|-
| 
! scope="row" | 
|
|-valign="top"
| 
! scope="row" | 
| Xinjiang  Gansu  Inner Mongolia  Shanxi  Hebei  Beijing (passing just north of the city centre)  Hebei  Tianjin  Hebei  Liaoning (for about )
|-
| style="background:#b0e0e6;" | 
! scope="row" style="background:#b0e0e6;" | Pacific Ocean
| style="background:#b0e0e6;" | Liaodong Bay, Yellow Sea
|-
| 
! scope="row" | 
| Liaoning (Liaodong Peninsula)
|-
| 
! scope="row" | 
|North Pyeongan Province - Passing through Sinuiju Jagang ProvinceSouth Hamgyeong Province - Passing just north of Hamheung
|-
| style="background:#b0e0e6;" | 
! scope="row" style="background:#b0e0e6;" | Pacific Ocean
| style="background:#b0e0e6;" | Sea of Japan
|-
| 
! scope="row" | 
| Mayang Island
|-
| style="background:#b0e0e6;" | 
! scope="row" style="background:#b0e0e6;" | Pacific Ocean
| style="background:#b0e0e6;" | Sea of Japan
|-valign="top"
| 
! scope="row" | 
| Island of Honshū— Akita Prefecture— Iwate Prefecture
|-
| style="background:#b0e0e6;" | 
! scope="row" style="background:#b0e0e6;" | Pacific Ocean
| style="background:#b0e0e6;" |
|-valign="top"
| 
! scope="row" | 
|-
| style="background:#b0e0e6;" | 
! scope="row" style="background:#b0e0e6;" | Atlantic Ocean
| style="background:#b0e0e6;" | Passing just north of Corvo Island, Azores, 
|-
| 
! scope="row" | 
| Passing near Figueira da Foz and Coimbra
|-
|-valign="top"
| 
! scope="row" | 
| Extremadura Castile-La Mancha Community of Madrid - for about  Castile-La Mancha Valencian Community - Rincón de Ademuz exclave, for about  Castile-La Mancha - for about  Aragon Valencian Community
|}

United States

The parallel 40° north forms the boundary between the states of Kansas and Nebraska.  On 30 May 1854, the Kansas–Nebraska Act created the Territory of Kansas and the Territory of Nebraska divided by the parallel 40° north.  Both territories were required to determine for themselves whether to permit slavery. Open conflict between free-state and pro-slavery forces in the Kansas Territory was one of the root causes of the American Civil War.

The parallel 40° north formed the original northern boundary of the British Colony of Maryland.  A subsequent royal grant gave the Colony of Pennsylvania land north of the 40th parallel but mistakenly assumed it would intersect the Twelve Mile Circle, which it does not. Pennsylvania's border was thus unclear and the colony pushed for a border far south of the 40th parallel. The Mason–Dixon Line was drawn between 1763 and 1767 as the compromise boundary between the overlapping claims of these two colonies.

The parallel 40° north passes through the cities of Philadelphia, Pennsylvania and Columbus, Ohio; as well as northern suburbs of Indianapolis, Indiana and Boulder, Colorado and the southern suburbs of Pittsburgh, Pennsylvania. The parallel goes directly through the John Glenn Columbus International Airport, with runway 10L-28R lying immediately north of the line, runway 10R-28L lying slightly south of it, and the line going through the northernmost edges of the terminal. It also passes through the main campus of The Ohio State University; specifically, it cuts directly across the Oval greenspace, between University Hall and the William Oxley Thompson Memorial Library.

Baseline Road in Boulder, Colorado, traces the parallel 40° north.

Thistle, Utah, a ghost town since 1983, is slightly (30 seconds or ) below 40° north.

Japan

Gallery

See also
40th parallel south
39th parallel north
41st parallel north
Baseline (surveying)
Geological Exploration of the Fortieth Parallel

References

n40
Geographic history of the United States
Borders of Nebraska
Borders of Kansas